The Aruba National Football team  (Dutch, "Arubaans voetbalelftal"; Papiamento, "Seleccion Arubano di futbol" is the official football team under 20 of Aruba and is controlled by the Arubaanse Voetbal Bond.

History

Road to the 2015 Championship
During the 1st round of qualification they were placed in group 4 along with Grenada, and Dominica. Aruba defeated both team with 1-0 win to qualify to the final round. During the final round they were placed in group B along with Haiti, Dominican Republic and Saint Kitts and Nevis. They would beat the Dominican Republic and Saint Kitts and Nevis both with 2-1 win, unfortunately lose to Haiti with 2-1 defeat. They would get second in the group and face off against Cuba which they lost 2-1. Their goalkeeper Jean Marc Antersijn, would win the Golden Glove, and they would win the Fair Play Award. This would be their first time competing in the CONCACAF Championship.

2015 Championship
On Aruba debut in the 2015 CONCACAF U-20 Championship the team would find it difficult to win a single game in the tournament. The team would go on to lose 4 out of the 5 games, drawing with host Jamaica in a 0-0 scoreline in their final game.

Current squad
 The following players were called up for the 2022 CONCACAF U-20 Championship.
 Match dates: 18 June – 3 July 2022
 Caps and goals correct as of:' 19 June 2022
 Names in italics denote players who have been capped for the senior team.''

See also
; Aruba U20 Team

References

External links
 ; Official website
  at the FIFA website.

under-20